Rebeca Ioana Necula (born 17 May 2003) is a Romanian professional handballer who plays as a centre back for Liga Națională club SCM Râmnicu Vâlcea.

References

External links
 HandbalVolei – Rebeca Necula

2003 births
Living people
Sportspeople from Brașov
Romanian female handball players
SCM Râmnicu Vâlcea (handball) players